Maxine Kurtz (October 17, 1921 – November 4, 2008 ) was an American city planner.

When Kurtz became the director of the Denver Planning Office in 1947, she became the first woman to direct the planning department of a major American city. Kurtz is also known for persuading the government of Denver and its neighboring suburbs to enter a historic water sharing agreement in return for concessions in sanitation, zoning and building.

Kurtz was the author of two books about her experiences in city planning and human rights:
Invisible Cage, A Memoir (2005)
City of Destiny:  Denver in the Making, with Ralph Conant

References

20th-century American women writers
University of Denver alumni
1921 births
2008 deaths
21st-century American women